Vladyslav Petrovych Shkinder (born 29 December 1998) is a Ukrainian professional footballer who plays as a centre-back for Ukrainian club Uzhhorod.

References

External links
 
 

1998 births
Living people
Place of birth missing (living people)
Ukrainian footballers
Association football defenders
Ukraine youth international footballers
FC Oleksandriya players
FC Uzhhorod players
Ukrainian First League players
Ukrainian Second League players